Bedoanas is a minor Austronesian language of the north coast of the Bomberai Peninsula. Bedoanas speakers reside in the villages of Andamata, Fior and Furir in the Arguni District, Fakfak Regency.

References

Languages of Indonesia
South Halmahera–West New Guinea languages